is a professional Japanese baseball player. He plays catcher for the Chunichi Dragons.

Ishibashi was widely regarded as the top high school aged catcher available at the 2018 NPB Draft.

Early career

On 25 October 2018, Ishibashi was selected as the 4th draft pick for the Chunichi Dragons at the 2018 NPB Draft and on 21 November signed a provisional contract with a ¥40,000,000 sign-on bonus and a ¥6,000,000 yearly salary.

Professional career

2019
On 7 July, Ishibashi made his professional debut as a pinch-hitter for Yuya Yanagi against the Tokyo Yakult Swallows. Ishibashi's debut marked the first time since Yasuhiko Kawai 1952 that a Dragons catcher, fresh out of high school had debuted in their first year and the first time since the draft was introduced. Two days later Ishibashi started against the Hiroshima Carp at Nagoya Dome with fellow teenager Tatsuya Shimizu on the mound.

Playing style
Ishibashi can long throw up to 115 metres, has a pop-time of 1.9 seconds and can bat for power.

Personal

Ishibashi considers Tokyo Yakult Swallows former catcher and manager, Atsuya Furuta along with hall of fame inductee Katsuya Nomura as his inspirations having read many of their books on catching.

References

External links
 Dragons.jp

2000 births
Living people
People from Yotsukaidō
Baseball people from Chiba Prefecture
Japanese baseball players
Nippon Professional Baseball catchers
Chunichi Dragons players